Walton Robert Lawson Taylor (December 28, 1886 – March 22, 1941) was an American attorney and politician who served on the Norfolk, Virginia city council. He retired in 1938, after being displaced as president of the council and mayor of the city by John A. Gurkin.

References

External links

1886 births
1941 deaths
Mayors of Norfolk, Virginia
20th-century American politicians